Tol'able David is a 1930 American pre-Code drama film directed by John G. Blystone and produced and released by Columbia Pictures. It is a remake of the 1921 silent film Tol'able David, which starred Richard Barthelmess and Ernest Torrence.

The Columbia film stars Richard Cromwell in the Barthelmess part after he won an audition over thousands of hopefuls and Harry Cohn gave him his screen name and a $75/week contract.

It is preserved in the Library of Congress.

Cast
Richard Cromwell as David Kinemon
Noah Beery as Luke Hatburn
Joan Peers as Esther Hatburn
Henry B. Walthall as Amos Hatburn
Tom Keene as Alan Kinemon
Edmund Breese as Hunter Kinemon
Barbara Bedford as Rose Kinemon
Helen Ware as Mrs. Kinemon
 Harlan Knight as Iska Hatburn
John Carradine as Buzzard Hatburn (*billed as Peter Richmond)

References

External links

 

1930 films
Films based on short fiction
Films directed by John G. Blystone
Columbia Pictures films
1930 drama films
Sound film remakes of silent films
Remakes of American films
American drama films
American black-and-white films
1930s American films